The 1999 Bank of the West Classic singles was the singles event of the twenty-eighth edition of the first tournament in the US Open Series.

Lindsay Davenport and Venus Williams were the respective defending champion and runner-up, and they met in the final again. Davenport won for a second consecutive year to claim her twenty-third singles title.

Seeds

Draw

Finals

Top half

Bottom half

Qualifying

Seeds

Qualifiers

Lucky loser
  Jane Chi

Qualifying draw

First qualifier

Second qualifier

Third qualifier

Fourth qualifier

External links
 WTA singles results page

Singles
Bank of the West Classic - Singles